The 2020–21 Austrian Cup was the 90th edition of the national cup in Austrian football. The champions of the cup earn a place in the 2021–22 Europa League play-off round.

Red Bull Salzburg were the defending champions after winning the competition in the previous season by defeating Austria Lustenau in the final.
Times up to 25 October 2020 and from 28 March 2021 were CEST (UTC+2), and times from 26 October 2020 to 27 March 2021 were CET (UTC+1).

First round 
Thirty–one first round matches were played between 28 August and 30 September 2020.

Second round
16 second round matches were played between 16 October and 14 November 2020.

Third round
Eight third round matches were played between 14 November and 16 December 2020.

Quarter-finals
The four quarter-final matches were played between 5 and 7 February 2021.

Semi-finals
The semi-final matches were played on 3 March 2021.

Final
The final was played on 1 May 2021.

Top goalscorers

See also 
 2020–21 Austrian Football Bundesliga

References

Austrian Cup seasons
Cup
Austrian Cup